Reg Wilson (born 26 January 1948 in Sheffield, England) is a retired professional speedway rider who was team manager of the Sheffield Tigers until 2011.

Wilson spent 18 years riding at the Owlerton club and attained a respectable average of 7.42, scoring a club record 3510.5 points including bonuses in the process. He was the team manager from 1992 until 2007.  In a recent poll of all the Sheffield riders ever he came in the top three.

References 

British speedway riders
Doncaster Stallions riders
Workington Comets riders
Birmingham Brummies riders
Newcastle Diamonds riders
Sheffield Tigers riders
Hull Vikings riders
Living people
1948 births